There are a number of punk bands originating in the United Kingdom.

See also
 List of punk rock bands, 0–K
 List of punk rock bands, L–Z
 List of post-punk bands
 List of new wave artists
 List of anarcho-punk bands
 List of riot grrrl bands

 
Punk
British punk music
Lists of bands